Brian Antoni is the author of the novel South Beach: The Novel. South Beach: The Novel is based on Antoni's firsthand knowledge of the resurgence of Miami Beach in the past two decades. 
His writing has also been included in the parody novel Naked Came the Manatee, where he wrote one of the chapters. He also writes non-fiction articles for travel magazines.

Background 

Brian Antoni was born in Detroit, Michigan, but was raised in Freeport Bahamas. His parents are from Trinidad. His sister is Janine Antoni, a well-known Bahamian artist. His brother Robert Antoni is a well-known Caribbean writer. Brian Antoni studied law at Emory University and got his law doctorate at Georgetown University. Although he never practiced as a lawyer, he is well known for his published book South Beach: The Novel. Brian Antoni currently lives in Miami Beach, New York City and Key West.

Bibliography 
Novels
2008 – South Beach: The Novel
1997 – Paradise Overdose
1996 – Naked Came the Manatee

References

External links 
 Official site of Brian Antoni

20th-century American novelists
20th-century American male writers
Living people
21st-century American novelists
American male novelists
American male short story writers
20th-century American short story writers
21st-century American short story writers
21st-century American male writers
Year of birth missing (living people)